Maimon is a Jewish surname, and may refer to:

 Ada Maimon (1893–1973), Israeli politician
 Alexander Ziskind Maimon (1809–1887), Jewish scholar
 David Maimon (1929–2010), Israeli army officer
 Frat Maimon (14th century), Jewish scholar
 Moses ben Maimon, known as Maimonides (1135–1204), rabbi, physician, and philosopher
 Moshe Maimon (1860–1924), Jewish Russian painter
 Salomon Maimon (1754–1800), German philosopher
 Shai Maimon (born 1986), Israeli footballer
 Shiri Maimon (born 1981), Israeli singer-songwriter, dancer and actress
 Yehuda Leib Maimon (1875–1962), Israeli rabbi and politician
 Yisrael Maimon (21st century), Israeli lawyer
 Maimon ben Joseph (12th century), rabbi and father of Maimonides

See also 
 Maimón

Hebrew-language surnames
Jewish surnames